Privies of Wales is a nonfiction book by J. Aelwyn Roberts, a former vicar of Llandegai. The book traces a history of human sanitation and examines individual examples of Welsh garden privies. The research for the book was paid for by a grant from Cadw.

Summary
The first half of the book presents a brief history of human sanitation disposal starting from the digging of small holes to the “earth closet”; the “privy pioneers” of the Minoans, Romans, and Normans; and information about cesspits. The second half examines multiple examples of Welsh privies, how they were constructed, and how they were used. Roberts also writes about industrial privies, public privies, and the restoration of old privies.

Development history
In 1998 Nicholas Battle, publisher of Countryside Books, asked Roberts to write a book on “The Privies of North Wales.” Although Roberts initially did not want to write such a book, Battle was able to persuade him. The author recalls:

Roberts was contacted by friends in south and mid-Wales about how they also had endangered privies but no way of "keeping them in remembrance." Roberts wrote to Cadw, the Welsh heritage service of the Welsh Assembly Government, to warn them of the "great catastrophe that was befalling [Wales]" with the loss of garden privies. Cadw offered a research grant to create the book on Welsh privies.

Publication history
2000, Wales, Tegai Publications , Paperback

References

External links
 Privies of Wales, the [Paperback]

2000 non-fiction books
Books about Wales
Architecture in Wales
Toilets